Asperger's Society of Ontario, formerly the Asperger's Society of Ontario, is a not-for-profit organization founded in 2000 by parents of children with Asperger syndrome and concerned professionals. Asperger's Society of Ontario is the only agency in Ontario that is solely devoted to serving those with Asperger syndrome, their families and other interested individuals.

The organization offers direct support to individuals with Asperger syndrome (AS), their families and caregivers, and provide information and resources related to Asperger syndrome to the public in an effort to improve public and professional awareness and acceptance of the unique challenges, strengths and needs of individuals with AS and their families. The services offered by Asperger's Society of Ontario include –
 Asperger's Society of Ontario Link: The Asperger's Society of Ontario Action Line, accessible by phone or email - Program specialists respond to requests for help and provide guidance on resources and services available across the province. Asperger's Society of Ontario Link offers a place for individuals with AS (and their families) to turn to in a time of need; a place where their unique circumstances and needs are understood, and Asperger's Society of Ontario helps connect them to the support they need as quickly and efficiently as possible.
 Asperger's Society of Ontario Website: a place for people to find information, keep apprised of upcoming community events, and search for services local to them via the online, searchable resource directory.
 Media Library: Housed on the Asperger's Society of Ontario website, the library hosts hundreds of books, websites, videos, blogs and resource guides all specific to AS.
 Social Media: The Asperger's Society of Ontario has a very strong and active social media presence providing an informal online support group and is a place to ask questions and network with others in a supportive, engaging environment.
 Asperger's Society of Ontario Adult Social Group: The group meets monthly in the Greater Toronto Area, and has a steady member base of 15-25 participants each month. The group participates in a number of activities (bowling, dining out, going to movies).  The focus of the group is on building friendships and on strengthening life skills. 
 Parent & Caregiver Support Groups: The group offers a place for parents to network, share resources, find support, listen to a variety of interesting speakers and engage in topical discussions.
All the services are offered free of charge.

Asperger's Society of Ontario is a small, volunteer driven charity and almost every person in the organization - from the Board of Directors members to staff and volunteers - is directly connected to Asperger syndrome, either themselves being a person with Asperger syndrome, or having a family member affected.

In 2018 the society considered changing its name after revelations of Hans Asperger's links to the Nazi euthanasia program.  They polled their members and found 86 preferred to say they had Asperger's Syndrome, while 19 preferred the term "autistic". In November 2020, the organization was rebranded from Asperger's Society of Ontario to Asperger's Society of Ontario.

References

External links 
 Asperger's Society of Ontario official web site

Organizations established in 2000
Medical and health organizations based in Ontario
Disability organizations based in Canada
2000 establishments in Ontario
Charities based in Canada
Autism-related organizations
Asperger syndrome